The AeroCad AeroCanard is a family of American amateur-built aircraft, designed and produced by AeroCad of Florissant, Missouri. The aircraft is supplied as a kit for amateur construction.

Design and development
The AeroCanard line of aircraft all feature a cantilever mid-wing, a canard tail, a four seat enclosed cabin and a single engine in pusher configuration. The tricycle landing gear features either fixed main wheels and a retractable nose wheel or fully retractable gear, depending on the model.

The aircraft is made from composites.

Operational history
By October 2012 four examples had been registered in the United States with the Federal Aviation Administration.

Variants
AeroCanard FG
Version with fixed main landing gear and retractable nose wheel. The estimated time to build this model is 1400 hours. Eighteen had been reported as completed and flown by the end of 2011.
AeroCanard RG
Version with fully retractable landing gear. The estimated time to build this model is 1700 hours. Three had been reported as completed and flown by the end of 2011.
AeroCanard SB
Version with fixed main landing gear, retractable nose wheel with a "smaller body" width at the front seats. The estimated time to build this model is 1500 hours. Two had been reported as completed and flown by the end of 2011.
AeroCanard SX
Version with fixed main landing gear and retractable nose wheel. The estimated time to build this model is 1400 hours. One had been reported as completed and flown by the end of 2011.

Specifications (AeroCanard RG)

References

External links

Homebuilt aircraft
Single-engined pusher aircraft
Canard aircraft